Pancreatitis is a condition characterized by inflammation of the pancreas. The pancreas is a large organ behind the stomach that produces digestive enzymes and a number of hormones. There are two main types: acute pancreatitis, and chronic pancreatitis. Signs and symptoms of pancreatitis include pain in the upper abdomen, nausea and vomiting. The pain often goes into the back and is usually severe. In acute pancreatitis, a fever may occur, and symptoms typically resolve in a few days. In chronic pancreatitis weight loss, fatty stool, and diarrhea may occur. Complications may include infection, bleeding, diabetes mellitus, or problems with other organs.

The two most common causes of acute pancreatitis are a gallstone blocking the common bile duct after the pancreatic duct has joined; and heavy alcohol use. Other causes include direct trauma, certain medications, infections such as mumps, and tumors. Chronic pancreatitis may develop as a result of acute pancreatitis. It is most commonly due to many years of heavy alcohol use. Other causes include high levels of blood fats, high blood calcium, some medications, and certain genetic disorders, such as cystic fibrosis, among others. Smoking increases the risk of both acute and chronic pancreatitis. Diagnosis of acute pancreatitis is based on a threefold increase in the blood of either amylase or lipase. In chronic pancreatitis, these tests may be normal. Medical imaging such as ultrasound and CT scan may also be useful.

Acute pancreatitis is usually treated with intravenous fluids, pain medication, and sometimes antibiotics. Typically eating and drinking are disallowed, and a nasogastric tube is placed in the stomach. A procedure known as an endoscopic retrograde cholangiopancreatography (ERCP) may be done to examine the distal common bile duct and remove a gallstone if present. In those with gallstones the gallbladder is often also removed. In chronic pancreatitis, in addition to the above, temporary feeding through a nasogastric tube may be used to provide adequate nutrition. Long-term dietary changes and pancreatic enzyme replacement may be required. And occasionally surgery is done to remove parts of the pancreas.

Globally, in 2015 about 8.9 million cases of pancreatitis occurred. This resulted in 132,700 deaths, up from 83,000 deaths in 1990. Acute pancreatitis occurs in about 30 per 100,000 people a year. New cases of chronic pancreatitis develop in about 8 per 100,000 people a year and currently affect about 50 per 100,000 people in the United States. It is more common in men than women. Often chronic pancreatitis starts between the ages of 30 and 40 while it is rare in children. Acute pancreatitis was first described on autopsy in 1882 while chronic pancreatitis was first described in 1946.

Signs and symptoms
The most common symptoms of pancreatitis are severe upper abdominal or left upper quadrant burning pain radiating to the back, nausea, and vomiting that is worse with eating. The physical examination will vary depending on severity and presence of internal bleeding. Blood pressure may be elevated by pain or decreased by dehydration or bleeding. Heart and respiratory rates are often elevated. The abdomen is usually tender but to a lesser degree than the pain itself. As is common in abdominal disease, bowel sounds may be reduced from reflex bowel paralysis. Fever or jaundice may be present. Chronic pancreatitis can lead to diabetes or pancreatic cancer. Unexplained weight loss may occur from a lack of pancreatic enzymes hindering digestion.

Complications
Early complications include shock, infection, systemic inflammatory response syndrome, low blood calcium, high blood glucose, and dehydration. Blood loss, dehydration, and fluid leaking into the abdominal cavity (ascites) can lead to kidney failure. Respiratory complications are often severe. Pleural effusion is usually present. Shallow breathing from pain can lead to lung collapse. Pancreatic enzymes may attack the lungs, causing inflammation. Severe inflammation can lead to intra-abdominal hypertension and abdominal compartment syndrome, further impairing renal and respiratory function and potentially requiring management with an open abdomen to relieve the pressure.

Late complications include recurrent pancreatitis and the development of pancreatic pseudocysts—collections of pancreatic secretions that have been walled off by scar tissue. These may cause pain, become infected, rupture and bleed, block the bile duct and cause jaundice, or migrate around the abdomen. Acute necrotizing pancreatitis can lead to a pancreatic abscess, a collection of pus caused by necrosis, liquefaction, and infection. This happens in approximately 3% of cases or almost 60% of cases involving more than two pseudocysts and gas in the pancreas.

Causes
Eighty percent of cases of pancreatitis are caused by alcohol or gallstones. Gallstones are the single most common cause of acute pancreatitis. Alcohol is the single most common cause of chronic pancreatitis. Triglyceride levels greater than 1000 mg/dL (11.29 mmol/L) is another cause.

Medications
There are seven classes of medications associated with acute pancreatitis: statins, ACE inhibitors, oral contraceptives/hormone replacement therapy (HRT), diuretics, antiretroviral therapy, valproic acid, and oral hypoglycemic agents. Mechanisms of these drugs causing pancreatitis are not known exactly, but it is possible that statins have direct toxic effect on the pancreas or through the long-term accumulation of toxic metabolites. Meanwhile, ACE inhibitors cause angioedema of the pancreas through the accumulation of bradykinin. Birth control pills and HRT cause arterial thrombosis of the pancreas through the accumulation of fat (hypertriglyceridemia). Diuretics such as furosemide have a direct toxic effect on the pancreas. Meanwhile, thiazide diuretics cause hypertriglyceridemia and hypercalcemia, where the latter is the risk factor for pancreatic stones.

HIV infection itself can cause a person to be more likely to get pancreatitis. Meanwhile, antiretroviral drugs may cause metabolic disturbances such as hyperglycemia and hypercholesterolemia, which predisposes to pancreatitis. Valproic acid may have direct toxic effect on the pancreas. There are various oral hypoglycemic agents that contributes to pancreatitis including metformin. But, glucagon-like peptide-1 (GLP-1) is more strongly associated with pancreatitis by promoting inflammation.

Atypical antipsychotics such as clozapine, risperidone, and olanzapine can also cause pancreatitis.

Infection
A number of infectious agents have been recognized as causes of pancreatitis including:
 Viruses
 Coxsackie virus
 Cytomegalovirus
 Hepatitis B
 Herpes simplex virus
 Mumps
 Varicella-zoster virus
 Bacteria
 Legionella
 Leptospira
 Mycoplasma
 Salmonella
 Fungi
 Aspergillus
 Parasites
 Ascaris
 Cryptosporidium
 Toxoplasma

Other
Other common causes include trauma, autoimmune disease, high blood calcium, hypothermia, and endoscopic retrograde cholangiopancreatography (ERCP). Pancreas divisum is a common congenital malformation of the pancreas that may underlie some recurrent cases. Diabetes mellitus type 2 is associated with a 2.8-fold higher risk.

Less common causes include pancreatic cancer, pancreatic duct stones, vasculitis (inflammation of the small blood vessels in the pancreas), and porphyria—particularly acute intermittent porphyria and erythropoietic protoporphyria.

There is an inherited form that results in the activation of trypsinogen within the pancreas, leading to autodigestion. Involved genes may include trypsin 1, which codes for trypsinogen, SPINK1, which codes for a trypsin inhibitor, or cystic fibrosis transmembrane conductance regulator.

The mnemonic GETSMASHED is often used to remember the common causes of pancreatitis: G—gallstones, E—ethanol, T—trauma, S—steroids, M—mumps, A—autoimmune pancreatitis, S—scorpion sting, H—hyperlipidemia, hypothermia, hyperparathyroidism, E—endoscopic retrograde cholangiopancreatography, D—drugs (commonly azathioprine, valproic acid, liraglutide).

Diagnosis
 
The differential diagnosis for pancreatitis includes but is not limited to cholecystitis, choledocholithiasis, perforated peptic ulcer, bowel infarction, small bowel obstruction, hepatitis, and mesenteric ischemia.

Diagnosis requires 2 of the 3 following criteria:
 Characteristic acute onset of epigastric or vague abdominal pain that may radiate to the back (see signs and symptoms above)
 Serum amylase or lipase levels ≥ 3 times the upper limit of normal
 An imaging study with characteristic changes. CT, MRI, abdominal ultrasound or endoscopic ultrasound can be used for diagnosis.

Amylase and lipase are 2 enzymes produced by the pancreas. Elevations in lipase are generally considered a better indicator for pancreatitis as it has greater specificity and has a longer half life. However, both enzymes can be elevated in other disease states. In chronic pancreatitis, the fecal pancreatic elastase-1 (FPE-1) test is a marker of exocrine pancreatic function. Additional tests that may be useful in evaluating chronic pancreatitis include hemoglobin A1C, immunoglobulin G4, rheumatoid factor, and anti-nuclear antibody.

For imaging, abdominal ultrasound is convenient, simple, non-invasive, and inexpensive. It is more sensitive and specific for pancreatitis from gallstones than other imaging modalities. However, in 25–35% of patients the view of the pancreas can be obstructed by bowel gas making it difficult to evaluate.

A contrast-enhanced CT scan is usually performed more than 48 hours after the onset of pain to evaluate for pancreatic necrosis and extrapancreatic fluid as well as predict the severity of the disease. CT scanning earlier can be falsely reassuring.

ERCP or an endoscopic ultrasound can also be used if a biliary cause for pancreatitis is suspected.

Treatment
The treatment of pancreatitis is supportive and depends on severity. Morphine generally is suitable for pain control. There are no clinical studies to suggest that morphine can aggravate or cause pancreatitis or cholecystitis.

The treatment for acute pancreatitis will depend on whether the diagnosis is for the mild form of the condition, which causes no complications, or the severe form, which can cause serious complications.

Mild acute pancreatitis
The treatment of mild acute pancreatitis is successfully carried out by admission to a general hospital ward. Traditionally, people were not allowed to eat until the inflammation resolved but more recent evidence suggests early feeding is safe and improves outcomes, and may result in an ability to leave the hospital sooner.

Due to inflammation occurring in pancreatitis, proinflammatory cytokines secreted into the bloodstream can cause inflammation throughout the body, including the lungs and can manifest as ARDS. Because pancreatitis can cause lung injury and affect normal lung function, supplemental oxygen is occasionally delivered through breathing tubes that are connected via the nose (e.g., nasal cannulae) or via a mask. The tubes can then be removed after a few days once it is clear that the condition is improving.

Dehydration may result during an episode of acute pancreatitis, so fluids will be provided intravenously.

Opioids may be used for the pain. When the pancreatitis is due to gallstones, early gallbladder removal also appears to improve outcomes.

Severe acute pancreatitis
Severe pancreatitis can cause organ failure, necrosis, infected necrosis, pseudocyst, and abscess. If diagnosed with severe acute pancreatitis, people will need to be admitted to a high-dependency unit or intensive care unit. It is likely that the levels of fluids inside the body will have dropped significantly as it diverts bodily fluids and nutrients in an attempt to repair the pancreas. The drop in fluid levels can lead to a reduction in the volume of blood within the body, which is known as hypovolemic shock. Hypovolemic shock can be life-threatening as it can very quickly starve the body of the oxygen-rich blood that it needs to survive. To avoid going into hypovolemic shock, fluids will be administered intravenously. Oxygen will be supplied through tubes attached to the nose and ventilation equipment may be used to assist with breathing. Feeding tubes may be used to provide nutrients, combined with appropriate analgesia.

As with mild acute pancreatitis, it will be necessary to treat the underlying cause—gallstones, discontinuing medications, cessation of alcohol, etc. If the cause is gallstones, it is likely that an ERCP procedure or removal of the gallbladder will be recommended. The gallbladder should be removed during the same hospital admission or within two weeks of pancreatitis onset so as to limit the risk of recurrent pancreatitis.

If the cause of pancreatitis is alcohol, cessation of alcohol consumption and treatment for alcohol dependency may improve pancreatitis. Even if the underlying cause is not related to alcohol consumption, doctors recommend avoiding it for at least six months as this can cause further damage to the pancreas during the recovery process.

Oral intake, especially fats, is generally restricted initially but early enteral feeding within 48 hours has been shown to improve clinical outcomes. Fluids and electrolytes are replaced intravenously. Nutritional support is initiated via tube feeding to surpass the portion of the digestive tract most affected by secreted pancreatic enzymes if there is no improvement in the first 72–96 hours of treatment.

Prognosis
Severe acute pancreatitis has mortality rates around 2–9%, higher where necrosis of the pancreas has occurred.

Several scoring systems are used to predict the severity of an attack of pancreatitis. They each combine demographic and laboratory data to estimate severity or probability of death. Examples include APACHE II, Ranson, BISAP, and Glasgow. The Modified Glasgow criteria suggests that a case be considered severe if at least three of the following are true:
 Age > 55 years
 Blood levels:
 PO2 oxygen < 60 mmHg or 7.9 kPa
 White blood cells > 15,000/µlitre
 Calcium < 2 mmol/litre
 Blood urea nitrogen  > 16 mmol/litre
 Lactate dehydrogenase (LDH) > 600iu/litre
 Aspartate transaminase (AST) > 200iu/litre
 Albumin < 32g/litre
 Glucose > 10 mmol/litre

This can be remembered using the mnemonic PANCREAS:
 PO2 oxygen < 60 mmHg or 7.9 kPa
 Age > 55
 Neutrophilia white blood cells > 15,000/µlitre
 Calcium < 2 mmol/litre
 Renal function (BUN) > 16 mmol/litre
 Enzymes lactate dehydrogenase (LDH) > 600iu/litre aspartate transaminase (AST) > 200iu/litre
 Albumin < 32g/litre
 Sugar glucose > 10 mmol/litre

The BISAP score (blood urea nitrogen level >25 mg/dl (8.9 mmol/L), impaired mental status, systemic inflammatory response syndrome, age over 60 years, pleural effusion) has been validated as similar to other prognostic scoring systems.

Epidemiology
Globally the incidence of acute pancreatitis is 5 to 35 cases per 100,000 people. The incidence of chronic pancreatitis is 4–8 per 100,000 with a prevalence of 26–42 cases per 100,000. In 2013 pancreatitis resulted in 123,000 deaths up from 83,000 deaths in 1990.

Costs
In adults in the United Kingdom, the estimated average total direct and indirect costs of chronic pancreatitis is roughly £79,000 per person on an annual basis. Acute recurrent pancreatitis and chronic pancreatitis occur infrequently in children, but are associated with high healthcare costs due to substantial disease burden. Globally, the estimated average total cost of treatment for children with these conditions is approximately $40,500/person/year.

Other animals
Fatty foods may cause canine pancreatitis in dogs.

See also 
 Exocrine pancreatic insufficiency

References

External links 

 
  GeneReviews/NCBI/NIH/UW entry on PRSS1-Related Hereditary Pancreatitis
 

Abdominal pain
Inflammations
Pancreas disorders
Herpes simplex virus–associated diseases
Wikipedia medicine articles ready to translate
Metabolic disorders
Wikipedia emergency medicine articles ready to translate